Merebene is a location on the now closed Gwabegar railway line in north-western New South Wales, Australia. A halt was located there between 1925 and 1971.

References

Disused regional railway stations in New South Wales
Railway stations in Australia opened in 1925
Railway stations in Australia opened in 1971